Aren is a commune in the Pyrénées-Atlantiques department in the Nouvelle-Aquitaine region of south-western France. It is part of the urban area (aire d'attraction des villes) of Oloron-Sainte-Marie.

The inhabitants of the commune are known as Arenais or Arenaises.

Geography

Aren is located some 14 km north-west of Oloron-Sainte-Marie immediately south of Saucède. The commune is divided into two portions - the eastern portion contains the village and is bordered in the north and east by the Gave d'Oloron. This portion is connected to the western part located to the west of the Joos river by the D325 road (which is part of the commune). Access to the commune is by the D936 road which crosses the "neck" of the commune and connects to the D325 road which goes east to the village. The D59 road also goes from the village south-west to Saint-Goin. The D25 also connects the "neck" of the commune to Préchacq-Josbaig in the north and crosses the Gave-d'Oleron north of this village - the nearest river crossing to the commune. The eastern portion of the commune consists of the village and farmland. The western portion, which has no hamlets, is heavily forested with some 30% of farmland.

Aren was part of the former arrondissement which grouped together the communes of Aren, Esquiule, Géronce, Geüs-d'Oloron, Orin, Préchacq-Josbaig, and Saint-Goin.

The commune lies in the Drainage basin of the Adour and the Gave d'Oloron flows from south to north then turns east at the northern border of the commune. The Joos river flows north across the "neck" of the commune and joins the Gave-d'Oloron north of Prechacq-Josbaig. In the western portion of the commune numerous streams rise including the Ibarle and the Larribau which all flow north eventually to join the Gave d'Oloron.

Places and Hamlets

 Arnabaigt
 Arroutis
 Bagolle
 Bugala
 La Campagne de Préchacq
 Estremeres
 Hippolyte
 Lannes
 Larraillet
 Loustalet
 Mirande
 La Naü
 Puheu
 Tatieu
 Vital

Toponymy
The commune name in béarnais is also Aren. Brigitte Jobbé-Duval indicated that the toponym Aren probably means domain of Arrius, the name of a former owner, who Michel Grosclaude called Arennius.

The following table details the origins of the commune name and other names in the commune.

Sources:

Raymond: Topographic Dictionary of the Department of Basses-Pyrenees, 1863, on the page numbers indicated in the table. 
Grosclaude: Toponymic Dictionary of communes, Béarn, 2006 
Cassini: Cassini Map from 1750

Origins:

Oloron: Cartulary of Oloron
Census: Census of Béarn
Insinuations: Insinuations of the Diocese of Oloron
Reformation: Reformation of Béarn

History
Paul Raymond noted on page 9 of his 1863 dictionary that in 1385 Aren had 23 fires and depended on the bailiwick of Oloron. The barony, which was established in 1658, was a vassal of the Viscounts of Béarn.

Administration

List of Successive Mayors

Inter-communality
The town is part of four inter-communal structures:
the Communauté de communes du Haut Béarn;
the AEP association of Aren-Préchacq-Josbaig;
the energy association of Pyrénées-Atlantiques;
the mixed association for oak forestry in the Basque and Béarn valleys.

Demography
In 2017 the commune had 246 inhabitants.

Economy
Economic activity is mainly agricultural (livestock, pasturage, polyculture). The town is part of the Appellation d'origine contrôlée (AOC) zone designation of Ossau-iraty.

Culture and Heritage
The patron saint of Aren is John the Baptist.

A village festival takes place on the last Sunday of June .

Civil heritage

The Chateau of Aren (15th century) is registered as an historical monument.

There are several old houses in the village which were counted in the census of Gaston Fébus in 1385 called Ploo, Carrere, and Paletz. Under the Viscounts of Béarn the inhabitants of Jaca were relocated to the commune and the mode of construction of the houses, uniquely in the Josbaig Valley, is similar to the Canfrance region and Jaca.

Religious heritage

The Church of Saint John the Baptist (19th century) is registered as an historical monument.

Environmental heritage
The hiking trail GR78 crosses the territory of the commune.

Notable people linked to the commune
Aren Stinger

See also
Communes of the Pyrénées-Atlantiques department

References

External links

Aren on the 1750 Cassini Map

Communes of Pyrénées-Atlantiques